The Data Documentation Initiative (also known as DDI) is an international standard for describing surveys, questionnaires, statistical data files, and social sciences study-level information. This information is described as metadata by the standard.

Begun in 1995, the effort brings together data professionals from around the world to develop the standard. The DDI specification, most often expressed in XML, provides a format for content, exchange, and preservation of questionnaire and data file information. DDI supports the description, storage, and distribution of social science data, creating an international specification that is machine-actionable and web-friendly.

Version 2 (also called "Codebook") of the DDI standard has been implemented in the Dataverse data repository and the data archives of the Inter-university Consortium for Political and Social Research. The latest version 3.3 (also called "Lifecycle") of the DDI standard was released in 2020.

Member Institutions

See also
 Colectica
 Metadata standards

References

External links
 DDI Project
 Official website
 DDI Tools

Related software/tools
 Colectica
 CSM's XCONVERT
 IHSN Microdata Management Toolkit
 Nesstar Publisher (development was discontinued and Nesstar reached end-of-life status in 2022)
 SDA to XML
 SPSSOMS2DDI
 The Dataverse Project
 Scholars Portal's Dataverse Data Explorer v.2
 Rich Data Services.

Metadata standards
Statistical data coding